Chlorortha chloromonas is a species of moth of the family Tortricidae. It is found in Venezuela.

References

Moths described in 1984
Polyorthini